Charles C. Waitt (October 14, 1853 – October 21, 1912), born in Hallowell, Maine, was a professional baseball player who played a total of four professional baseball seasons. Waitt played in an era when baseball had many differences from modern baseball. He threw right-handed, but it is unknown whether he batted right or left-handed.

Career
Charlie Waitt made his major league baseball debut on May 25, 1875 at age 22 with professional baseball club St. Louis Brown Stockings. While playing for the St. Louis Brown Stockings, Waitt had 113 at-bats, 23 runs, 2 base on balls, and 7 strikeouts.

Waitt is probably best known for being one of the first baseball players to wear a glove. He began wearing it around the 1875 baseball season, and was teased, taunted, laughed at by fans and his teammates, and called a "sissy" for doing so. The glove, which he wore to protect his hand, was very different from the gloves used today. He attempted to disguise them by using flesh-coloured gloves to make them as inconspicuous as possible.

After not playing the  baseball season, Waitt was purchased from the St. Louis Brown Stockings by the Chicago White Stockings (today named the Chicago Cubs). With the Chicago White Stockings, he had only 41 at-bats, 4 hits, and 2 RBI. He had the most at-bats playing for them, some 250. Waitt played his final baseball game on September 18, 1883.

Death
Waitt died on October 21, 1912, at age 59. He accidentally fell while washing a window. He was buried in the Sunset Cemetery in San Francisco.

References

External links
 Baseball Reference
 Baseball Almanac
 Baseball Library
 Baseball Prospectus

Major League Baseball first basemen
St. Louis Brown Stockings (NA) players
Chicago White Stockings players
Baltimore Orioles players
Philadelphia Quakers players
Baseball players from Maine
Accidental deaths from falls
Accidental deaths in California
People from Hallowell, Maine
1853 births
1912 deaths
Rochester (minor league baseball) players
Philadelphia Athletic players
New Bedford (minor league baseball) players
New Haven (minor league baseball) players
Hartford (minor league baseball) players
Wilmington Quicksteps (minor league) players
Lancaster (minor league baseball) players
19th-century baseball players